Alejandro Rojas (born 6 January 1962) is a Chilean rower. He competed at the 1984 Summer Olympics and the 1988 Summer Olympics.

References

External links
 

1962 births
Living people
Chilean male rowers
Olympic rowers of Chile
Rowers at the 1984 Summer Olympics
Rowers at the 1988 Summer Olympics
Place of birth missing (living people)
Pan American Games medalists in rowing
Pan American Games silver medalists for Chile
Rowers at the 1983 Pan American Games
20th-century Chilean people